is a Japanese footballer who plays as a forward for Mito HollyHock, on loan from Gamba Osaka.

Career statistics

Club
.

References

External links

2002 births
Living people
People from Toyonaka, Osaka
Association football people from Osaka Prefecture
Japanese footballers
Japan youth international footballers
Association football forwards
Gamba Osaka players
Gamba Osaka U-23 players
Ehime FC players
Mito HollyHock players
J1 League players
J2 League players
J3 League players